Petar Zivkov (born 26 January 1995) is an Austrian footballer who plays as a left-back.

Career
Born in Vienna, he played with SV Wienerberg, SK Rapid Wien, FK Austria Wien, SC Team Wiener and Trenkwalder Admira in Vienna during his youth career, besides OFK Beograd in Serbia as well. In 2011, he moves to Italy, and after playing in the youth teams of Chievo Verona and Carpi 1909, he debuted as senior playing with lower-league Italian clubs such as Civitanovese and Fermana. During 2014 he spent some time back in Serbia with OFK Beograd bur without debuting in the league. Then he returned to Italy, and, after a spell with Matelica, he spends a season with RapalloBogliasco. His regular performances earned him a contract with Vicenza. He made a debut in the 2016–17 Serie B on 9 October 2016, in a home game against Cesena, a 0–0 draw.

On 10 July 2018, he signed with Reggina. The contract is for one year with another one-year extension option. On 21 January 2019, he moved on loan to Rende.

On 3 July 2019, he signed with Casertana.

References

1995 births
Living people
Footballers from Vienna
Austrian footballers
Austrian people of Serbian descent
Association football fullbacks
Serie B players
Serie C players
OFK Beograd players
Fermana F.C. players
L.R. Vicenza players
Reggina 1914 players
Casertana F.C. players
Austrian expatriate footballers
Austrian expatriate sportspeople in Italy
Expatriate footballers in Italy